Chairmen of the State Assembly of the Sakha Republic.

It was preceded by the Supreme Soviet. The legislature was bicameral 1994-2003 and consisted of the Chamber of the Republic and the House of Representatives.

Chairmen of the Supreme Soviet

Chairmen of the Chamber of the Republic

Chairmen of the House of Representatives

Chairmen of the State Assembly of the Sakha Republic

Sources

Official website - history

Lists of legislative speakers in Russia
Chairmen